Philippe van Kessel (14 January 1946 – 11 February 2022) was a Belgian actor and stage director. He is known for his roles in Largo Winch II, Eternity, and Working Girls.

Life and career 
In 1973, with his mother Françoise van Kessel and Stanislas Defize, Philippe founded the Atelier Saint-Anne in Brussels, a café-theatre then located near the Grand Sablon. He left his theater in 1990 to run the National Theater of Belgium for fifteen years.

Philippe was a professor at INSAS and at the school of the National Theatre of Strasbourg.

He died on 11 February 2022, at the age of 76.

References

1946 births
2022 deaths
Belgian male actors
Belgian theatre directors
Male actors from Brussels
Officers of the Order of the Crown (Belgium)